Now Band or Noband may refer to:
 Now Band-e Jadid
 Now Band-e Qadim